Hans-Joachim Newiger (1 April 1925 – 26 December 2011) was a German classical philologist.

Life 
Born in Königsberg, Newiger was appointed on 21 December 1953 at the University of Kiel with his Dissertation Metaphern und Chorpersonifikationen bei Aristophanes, which was published in 1957 in extended form under the title Metapher und Allegorie. Studien zu Aristophanes (2000 reprint). From 1969 to 1971 he was professor of classical philology at the TU Berlin.

Newiger was one of the leading Aristophanes experts. He was a corresponding member of the Deutsches Archäologisches Institut.

Publications 
 Drama und Theater. Ausgewählte Schriften zum griechischen Drama, ed. by Michael Erler, Martin Hose, Bernhard Zimmermann, Stuttgart 1996 (Drama Beiheft 2).
 Die Orestie und das Theater.

Literature 
 : Hans-Joachim Newiger †. In Gnomon. Volume 84 (2012),  (with picture)

References

External links 
 

German philologists
Academic staff of the Technical University of Berlin
Academic staff of the University of Konstanz
University of Kiel alumni
1925 births
2011 deaths
Writers from Königsberg